Anna Vasilievna Maraeva (1845-1928), was a Russian industrialist. She was the daughter of Vasily and Makrina Volkovy and married to Methodius (Nefed) Vasilyevich Maraev (1830-1882). She was a prominent paper- and textile industrialist from 1884. She is known as a follower of the old orthodox religion and known as an art collector: her collection became the foundation of the Serpukhov Art Museum.

References
 Любартович В. А. Новые данные к биографии владелицы «Пустозерского сборника» Серпуховской купчихи А. В. Мараевой // Старообрядчество в России (XVII—XX вв.) / под ред. Е. М. Юхименко : Сб. науч. тр. — М.: Языки русской культуры, 1999. — С. 428—438. — .

19th-century businesspeople from the Russian Empire
1845 births
1928 deaths
Russian art collectors
Women art collectors